James O. Page JD (August 7, 1936 – September 4, 2004) was recognized as a leading authority on United States emergency medical services (EMS). James was born in Alhambra, California, and frequently moved between California and Kansas as a youth. After holding a number of jobs, including an ambulance attendant in East Los Angeles, he received his first job in the fire service with Monterey Park Fire Department.  After failing a medical clearance with Los Angeles City Fire Department Page served in the Los Angeles County Fire Department for 16 years rising to the rank of Battalion Chief. While working with the department, he began his studies in law at Southwestern Law School. Recognizing an opportunity, management in the Los Angeles County Fire Department placed problematic firefighters under Page's supervision hoping that his litigious training would hasten their dismissal. However, Page refused to serve as the department's "executioner."

In 1973 he was appointed as the first director of North Carolina's statewide EMS system. North Carolina gained a national reputation for excellence in pre-hospital care during his tenure. In 1975, he was appointed as Executive Director of Lakes Area Emergency Medical Services in Buffalo, NY and spearheaded the development and implementation of the 8-county western New York EMS system.

During the early 1970s Jim Page served as a technical advisor for NBC Television's popular show Emergency! This program captured the US public's imagination and created a public demand for quality pre-hospital care. In 1976 Page took the leadership reins of the ACT Foundation becoming a popular public speaker, advisor, and author of topics in emergency medicine. The character of Johnny Gage, a paramedic that appeared on the series was considered to have been named in honor of Page, although the name had been changed, so as to keep in context.

Page published several books and magazines about the EMS community.  He is generally recognized as the official historian of EMS.

References

Further reading
The Paramedics, Backdraft Publications, 1979, hardcover, 179 pages, #79-89566
The Magic of 3am, Journal of Emergency Medical Services, 2002, softcover, 177 pages, #0936174137

External links 
Journal of Emergency Medical Services
James O. Page Biography
James O. Page  Obit in Firehouse Magazine
 Obit in JEMS Magazine
Obit in Mergeinet
at  Page, Wolfberg & Wirth, LLC Website

1936 births
2004 deaths
American firefighters